Christine Anne Milne  (born 14 May 1953) is an Australian politician who served as a Senator for Tasmania. She was the leader of the parliamentary caucus of the Australian Greens from 2012 to 2015. Milne stepped down as leader on 6 May 2015, replaced by Richard Di Natale.

Early life and education
Milne was born in Latrobe, Tasmania, the second daughter of Wesley Vale dairy farmers Tom and June Morris. She attended Wesley Vale Area School from 1959 to 1963, St Mary's College, Hobart as a boarder from 1964 to 1969, and completed her final year of schooling at Devonport High School in 1970.

She studied history and political science at the University of Tasmania from 1971 to 1974, where she resided at Ena Waite University College and was elected its President. She graduated with a Bachelor of Arts degree with Honours in Australian History, and a Certificate of Education in March 1975.

From 1975 to 1984 Milne worked as a secondary school teacher, teaching English, History and Social Science at Parklands High School, Devonport High School and Don College. She first came to public attention for her role in opposing the building of the Wesley Vale pulp mill near Bass Strait in North Western Tasmania on the basis of its environmental impact. She also participated in the ultimately successful campaign opposing the Franklin Dam and was arrested and jailed in 1983. She worked as a research officer with the Australian Bicentennial Historical Records Search from 1987 to 1988.

Political career
Milne was first elected to the Tasmanian House of Assembly in 1989 as a member of the Tasmanian Greens in the electorate of Lyons, one of five Green politicians elected at that election. She was part of the Labor–Green Accord, a political agreement between the Australian Labor Party (ALP) and the Tasmanian Greens to form government after the 1989 general election had resulted in a hung parliament. When Bob Brown stood down in 1993 to contest the federal election, she became leader of the Greens in the Tasmanian Parliament and the first female leader of a political party in Tasmania.

She oversaw a loose alliance between the Greens and Labor after the 1996 general election. During that time, Tasmania saw significant economic and social reform. Measures included gun law reform, liberalisation of gay laws, an apology to the Indigenous stolen generation and support for an Australian republic.

In 1998, the major parties voted to restructure the House of Assembly from 35 to 25 seats, increasing the quota of votes required to be elected to the Tasmanian House of Assembly. Liberal Premier Tony Rundle immediately called an election, which his party subsequently lost. Due to the changes, Milne lost her seat, leaving the Greens with one remaining seat.

After her career in state politics, Milne was an adviser to Senator Bob Brown from 2000 until she was elected to represent Tasmania in the Federal Senate at the 2004 federal election. Preferences to Family First from the Australian Labor Party almost prevented her from being elected; however, she managed to reach a quota mostly as a result of the high level of below-the-line voting in Tasmania. The other Green elected at that election was Rachel Siewert from Western Australia. Milne was part of Bob Brown's frontbench covering the portfolios of Arts, Climate change, Competition Policy & Small Business, Finance & Administration, Food Security, Regional Australia, Resources & Energy, and Trade.

Milne was Vice-President of the International Union for Conservation of Nature (IUCN, also known as the World Conservation Union) from 2005 to 2008. She became Deputy Leader of the Australian Greens on 10 November 2008.

In 2009, Milne debated the shortcomings of Australian Climate Change Regulatory Authority Bill 2009 in the federal parliament.

On 13 April 2012, Milne became the leader of the Australian Greens after the resignation of Bob Brown. She reorganised the Green's front bench.

On 6 May 2015, Milne announced her immediate resignation from the leadership of the Australian Greens, and foreshadowed her departure from the Senate. Milne resigned from the Senate on 10 August 2015.

References

External links

 

|-

|-

1953 births
Living people
Australian environmentalists
Australian women environmentalists
Australian Greens members of the Parliament of Australia
Australian Greens members of the Parliament of Tasmania
Australian republicans
Australian schoolteachers
Delegates to the Australian Constitutional Convention 1998
20th-century Australian politicians
Australian LGBT rights activists
Members of the Australian Senate
Members of the Australian Senate for Tasmania
Members of the Tasmanian House of Assembly
People from Latrobe, Tasmania
Women members of the Australian Senate
University of Tasmania alumni
Leaders of the Australian Greens
20th-century Australian women politicians
21st-century Australian politicians
21st-century Australian women politicians
Women members of the Tasmanian House of Assembly
Officers of the Order of Australia
Women civil rights activists